The 1885 Waimea by-election was a by-election held on 3 June 1885 in the  electorate during the 9th New Zealand Parliament.

The by-election was caused by the resignation of the incumbent MP Joseph Shephard on 15 April 1885.

The by-election was won by John Kerr. The runner up was William Norris Franklyn (who, at some point, was chair of Waimea County Council) by three votes, with six candidates having contested the election.

Results

Notes

References

Waimea 1885
1885 elections in New Zealand
Politics of the Marlborough Region
June 1885 events
Politics of the Nelson Region